John Dennis Concannon  (16 May 1930 – 14 December 2003), known as Don Concannon, was a British Labour Party politician.

Born in Doncaster, West Riding of Yorkshire, Concannon was educated at Rossington Secondary School and through the Extra-Mural Department of the University of Nottingham. He worked as a miner and as a National Union of Mineworkers (NUM) official. He was a councillor on Mansfield Borough Council from 1963.

Concannon was elected as the Member of Parliament for Mansfield at the 1966 election. Under Harold Wilson and James Callaghan (Prime Minister from 1976 to 1979), he served as a government whip and as Northern Ireland minister, and was appointed a member of the Privy Council in 1978. He was sponsored by the NUM.

A serious car accident led to his retirement as MP for Mansfield at the 1987 election; Alan Meale succeeded him in the seat.

Concannon died in Mansfield on 14 December 2003, aged 73.

References
Times Guide to the House of Commons 1983
Almanac of British Politics (1999)
Obituary in The Guardian

External links

1930 births
2003 deaths
People from Doncaster
Alumni of the University of Nottingham
Labour Party (UK) MPs for English constituencies
Members of the Privy Council of the United Kingdom
National Union of Mineworkers-sponsored MPs
UK MPs 1966–1970
UK MPs 1970–1974
UK MPs 1974
UK MPs 1974–1979
UK MPs 1979–1983
UK MPs 1983–1987
Councillors in Nottinghamshire
Northern Ireland Office junior ministers